Unified Remote is a mobile application from Unified Intents for remote controlling programs on a user’s computer from their smartphone. This application attempts to simplify the task of controlling many different programs from one app, and includes support for 70+ applications such as Spotify, YouTube, VLC Media Player, and Windows Media Player.

Background 
Unified Remote is the result of a hobby project of two Swedish students, Jakob Berglund and Philip Bergqvist, which later turned into a profitable start-up venture. The app was first launched as a free app on Android in 2010, with simple features and support for 13 remote controls for Windows applications. A year later, an improved version was released, as well as a paid (premium) version including more features and remote controls. The latest version was launched in 2014, which included an overhauled user interface and introduced support for iOS, Mac, and Linux.

Growth 

Since 2010, the company has gained popularity in online media within social media, news sites, and blogger communities. Most notably, the app has been featured on sites such as:
 
CNET
TheJournal
PC World
Gizmodo UK
Lifehacker
Android Police.

International media coverage includes:

Brazil
Poland
Germany,
Sweden

The app has over 3 million downloads worldwide and is rated among the top apps for Android on Play Store.

Features 

The application provides many remote controls for various programs. This includes basic mouse and keyboard input and support for media applications, presentation software, and even power functions. The server also provides an open API, which makes it possible for developers to create their own custom remote controls.

Competitors 

There are several different apps on the various app stores that provide similar universal remote control functionality. Other competitors also include official apps for different media applications, which instead provide dedicated remote control functionality for specific applications.

In more recent years, software vendors have begun to target smartphones, tablets, and smart TVs directly, thus making the need for a computer remote control redundant. This is especially apparent within the home entertainment space with products such as Apple TV, AirPlay, and Chromecast.

References

External links 

2010 software
Android (operating system) software
Remote control